Thirupparaitturai is a village in the Srirangam taluk of Tiruchirappalli district in Tamil Nadu, India. It is situated on the south bank of the River Cauvery. Trichy-Karur National High Way, Trichy-Palakkad Railway Line (Railway Station: Elamanur) have been laid through this village. It is 16 kilometers away from Trichy. The place is known for Paraithurainathar temple.

History
The ancient Shiva Temple is at a bosom of this village. There were a lot of parai trees in ancient days. As parai trees had grown in abundance in this village in olden days this village is called Thiru "parai" thurai.
This village is also a home to Shri Rajagopalan Swami. The 150 year old temple is adjacent to the Shiva temple.

Boundary of the village
East : Elamanur 
West : Perugamani 
South: Analai 
North: The Holy River Cauvery

Legends
Sri Ramakrishna Tapovanam  founded by Swami Chidbhavananda and Ramakrishna Kudil founded by Bramhachari Ramaswamy are the famous institutions doing commendably Yeoman and meritorious services in the academic domain and in the spiritual sphere from this village.

The Temple
Paraithurainathar temple is a Padal petra sthalam. The great Nayanars and ArunagiriNathar have sung in praise of the presiding deity of Thirupparaitturai temple.

References

External links
 Sri Ramakrishna Tapovanam (Sri Ramakrishna Tapovanam website).
 Paraithuraishiva temple (official website).

Villages in Tiruchirappalli district